Stremitelny was one of 29  (officially known as Project 7) built for the Soviet Navy during the late 1930s. Completed in 1938, the ship was assigned to the Baltic Fleet and played a minor role in the 1939–1940 Winter War against Finland. Stremitelny was transferred to the Northern Fleet in mid-1940. After the start of the German invasion of the Soviet Union (Operation Barbarossa) in June 1941, she covered an amphibious landing along the Arctic coast. The ship was attacked and sunk by German dive bombers the following month in Polyarny with the loss of 111 crew and passengers. Her wreck was partially salvaged the following year.

Design and description
Having decided to build the large and expensive   destroyer leaders, the Soviet Navy sought Italian assistance in designing smaller and cheaper destroyers.

Their crew numbered 197 officers and sailors in peacetime and 236 in wartime. The designers had been conservative in rating the turbines and many, but not all, of the ships handily exceeded their designed speed during their sea trials. Others fell considerably short of it. Stremitelny reached  during her trials in 1938.

As built, the Gnevny-class ships mounted four  B-13 guns in two pairs of superfiring single mounts fore and aft of the superstructure. Anti-aircraft defense was provided by a pair of  34-K AA guns in single mounts and a pair of  21-K AA guns as well as two  DK or DShK machine guns. They carried six  torpedo tubes in two rotating triple mounts; each tube was provided with a reload. The ships could also carry a maximum of either 60 or 95 mines and 25 depth charges. The ships were equipped with two K-1 paravanes intended to destroy mines and a pair of depth-charge throwers.

Construction and service 
Built in Leningrad's Shipyard No. 189 (Ordzhonikidze) as yard number 291, Stremitelny was laid down on 22 August 1936 and launched on 4 February 1937. Completed on 18 November 1938, she was commissioned into the Baltic Fleet on 29 November. The ship served on patrol and escort duty during the Winter War, aside from bombarding the coastal artillery positions on the Finnish island of Russarö on 1 December 1939 with her sister ship  and the light cruiser . Stremitelny was transferred to the Northern Fleet on 9 May 1940.

When Operation Barbarossa, the German invasion of the Soviet Union, began on 22 June 1941, the ship was based in Polyarny. Six days later, she was attacked by Junkers Ju 87 "Stuka" dive bombers while docked in Polyarny and was struck by four bombs amidships. They detonated in the boiler and engine rooms, killing all the crewmen in those compartments and breaking the ship in half. The stern section sank in a few minutes, but the bow section took 20 minutes to sink. A total of 111 people were killed, including several entertainers who were giving a performance aboard when the aircraft attacked. Her wreck was partially salvaged in April 1942 and her stern was used to repair her sister .

Citations

Sources

Further reading
 

Gnevny-class destroyers
1937 ships
Ships built at the Baltic Shipyard
Ships sunk by German aircraft
Destroyers sunk by aircraft
World War II shipwrecks in the Arctic Ocean